Chujachen Assembly constituency is one of the 32 Legislative Assembly constituencies of Sikkim state in India. It is part of Pakyong district.

Member of the Legislative Assembly

Election results

2019

See also
 List of constituencies of the Sikkim Legislative Assembly
 Pakyong district

References

Pakyong district
Assembly constituencies of Sikkim